Pacific Harbour is a town in Fiji, located in the Central District and Serua Province, on the island of Viti Levu. According to estimates for the year 2009, it had 1,874 inhabitants. It has a primary school, a health care,a bank,shopping outlets, service station, market, restaurants, villas, resorts and hotels plus a marina, a sports ground, a police post, post office, taxi stand and bus shelters.

References 

Populated places in Fiji